Ace Records was a record label that was started in August 1955 in Jackson, Mississippi by Johnny Vincent, with Teem Records as its budget subsidiary.

History 
Ace also had the Vin label. Its records were distributed independently until 1962 when a distribution arrangement was set up with Vee-Jay Records. Ace Records stopped when Vee-Jay ran out of funds and went out of business. The label was relaunched in 1971 and sold in 1997 to the Demon Music Group in the UK.

Ace recorded such artists as Earl King, Frankie Ford, Jimmy Clanton, Huey "Piano" Smith, Joe Tex, Scotty McKay, and Bobby Marchan.

Ace Records received a marker on the Mississippi Blues Trail.

Notable songs

 "Rockin' Pneumonia and the Boogie Woogie Flu" by Huey "Piano" Smith and The Clowns (1957)
 "Don't You Just Know It" by Huey "Piano" Smith and The Clowns (1958)
 "Just a Dream" by Jimmy Clanton (1958)
 "Sea Cruise" by Frankie Ford (1958)
 "Go, Jimmy, Go" by Jimmy Clanton (1959)
 "Gee Baby" by Joe and Ann (1959 - 1960)
 "Pop-Eye" by Huey "Piano" Smith and The Clowns (1962)
 "Venus in Blue Jeans" by Jimmy Clanton (1962)

See also
 Ace Records (UK)
 List of record labels
 Ace Records artists with Wikipedia pages
 :Category:Ace Records (United States) albums

References

External links
 Album discography
 Singles discography
 Rock 'n Roll: An Interview with Johnny Vincent of Ace Records

American record labels
Record labels established in 1955
Mississippi Blues Trail
1955 establishments in Mississippi